The 5th National Assembly of Laos was elected by a popular vote on 24 February 2002 and was replaced by the 6th National Assembly on 8 June 2006.

Meetings

Members

References

Citations

Bibliography
Books:

5th National Assembly of Laos
2002 establishments in Laos
2006 disestablishments in Laos